Hoodoo is a ski resort in the northwest United States, in the central Cascade Range of Oregon.  Located near the summit of Santiam Pass on U.S. Route 20, the ski area operates on federal land through agreement with Willamette National Forest on Hoodoo Butte, a volcanic cinder cone. Hoodoo's slopes primarily face northeast.

History
The ski area was built  in 1938, by a group funded by Ed Thurston of Bend. The group wanted to build on Three Fingered Jack but could not secure funding for a road. Following World War II, the ski area embarked on improvements, including lodging and chairlifts.

Its three-story main lodge at the base was built in the late 1940s from World War II surplus structures and included sleeping quarters for 100 guests. It was threatened by a forest fire in the summer of 1967, but was spared by the use of back fires. An antiquated chairlift, with wooden towers, was destroyed. Less than a year later and unoccupied at the time except for a family dog, the lodge was destroyed by fire in April 1968. A new two-story day lodge was constructed later in the year, and the use of pickup campers became popular at the Hoodoo parking lot. In the 1960s, the ski area was purchased by Hoodoo Ski Bowl Developers, Inc., which later built the Manzanita chair lift.

In the fall of 1985, the ski area took over the management of historic Santiam Lodge, which was built in 1940 by the Civilian Conservation Corps (CCC). Formerly operated by the United Presbyterian Church, it provided dormitory-style lodging for up to 80 guests.

In 1999, Hoodoo Ski Area was acquired by real estate developer and Umbrella Properties owner Chuck Shepard of  Since then, Hoodoo has built the Hodag chair lift, a  lodge, the Autobahn Tubing Park, and replaced the green and red double chair lifts with quad chair lifts.

Skiing
Hoodoo has a  full service lodge. Green is a 2001 replacement for the old double chair. The Ed chair, named after Hoodoo's founder, Ed Thurston, replaced the aging Red lift in 2001. The Manzanita triple chair serves the bowl, terrain park, and is open for night skiing. The Hodag lift was built in 1999 and services the backside terrain. The beginner area consists of a double chair (named Easy Rider) and is isolated from other terrain. Hoodoo also has a large selection of Nordic Skiing trails, both at high and lower altitudes.

The tube hill, called the Autobahn Tubing Park, is on the northwest flanks of Hayrick Butte.

Hoodoo offers RV camping on the south side of the parking lot.

Stats
Lifts
Green Chair - Quad chair
Manzanita Chair (formerly known as blue) - Triple chair
Ed Chair (formerly known as red) - Quad chair
Hodag Chair - Quad chair
Easy Rider - Double Chair
None of these chairs are detachable

Runs
Longest Run - Over Easy (from summit)
Steepest Run - Chuck's Backside
34 Runs total
20% Easiest
39% Difficult
41% Most Difficult

Photo gallery

References

External links 

History of Hoodoo and the Santiam Pass Ski Patrol

Ski areas and resorts in Oregon
Buildings and structures in Linn County, Oregon
Tourist attractions in Linn County, Oregon
1938 establishments in Oregon